Angola competed at the 1996 Summer Olympics in Atlanta, United States.

Athletics

Men
Track and road events

Women
Track and road events

Basketball

Men's tournament

Roster
 Victor de Carvalho
 Herlander Coimbra
 David Dias
 José Guimarães
 Aníbal Moreira
 Benjamim João Romano
 Honorato Trosso
 Benjamim Ucuahamba
 Angelo Victoriano
 Edmar Victoriano
 Justino Victoriano
Preliminary round

Classification Round 9th-12th

11th place match

Handball

Women
Preliminary group B

7th place match

Team roster

Anica Neto
Maria Gonçalves
Filomena Trindade
Domingas Cordeiro
Maura Faial
Anabela Joaquim
Elisa Webba
Palmira Barbosa
Luzia Bizerra
Justina Praça
Lia Paulo
Maria Eduardo
Elisa Peres

Shooting

Men

Swimming

Women

See also
 Angola at the 1996 Summer Paralympics

References

External links
Official Olympic Reports

Nations at the 1996 Summer Olympics
1996
Olympics